Serge Bindy (born 23 October 1954) is a Swiss modern pentathlete. He competed at the 1976 Summer Olympics.

References

1954 births
Living people
Swiss male modern pentathletes
Olympic modern pentathletes of Switzerland
Modern pentathletes at the 1976 Summer Olympics